Radical Sonora is Enrique Bunbury's first solo album after his involvement with Heroes Del Silencio. It is an electronic rock album. It was distributed by Chrysalis Records.

Track listing
Big-bang   
Negativo   
Encadenados   
Contracorriente   
Planeta sur   
Alicia (expulsada al país de las maravillas)   
Salomé   
Servidor de nadie 
Despacio   
Polen   
Nueve    
Alfa

The edition for America does not include track 11, Nueve.

Certifications

References

1997 debut albums
Enrique Bunbury albums
Chrysalis Records albums
Albums produced by Phil Manzanera